Leith Brodie (born 16 July 1986) is an Australian sprint freestyle and medley swimmer who is an Olympic bronze medalist and was trained by John Robinson at Albany Creek Swim Club.  At the 2008 Summer Olympics in Beijing, Brodie won a pair of bronze medals as a member of the Australian teams in the men's 4×100-metre freestyle relay and the 4x200-metre freestyle relay.

See also 
 List of Commonwealth Games medallists in swimming (men)
 List of Olympic medalists in swimming (men)

References

External links
 

1986 births
Living people
Olympic swimmers of Australia
Swimmers at the 2008 Summer Olympics
Olympic bronze medalists for Australia
Commonwealth Games bronze medallists for Australia
Swimmers at the 2010 Commonwealth Games
Olympic bronze medalists in swimming
Australian male medley swimmers
Australian male freestyle swimmers
World Aquatics Championships medalists in swimming
Medalists at the 2008 Summer Olympics
Commonwealth Games gold medallists for Australia
Commonwealth Games medallists in swimming
People educated at St Joseph's College, Nudgee
People from the Mid North Coast
Sportsmen from New South Wales
21st-century Australian people
Medallists at the 2010 Commonwealth Games